Cossulus kabulense is a moth in the family Cossidae. It is found in Afghanistan.

References

Natural History Museum Lepidoptera generic names catalog

Cossinae
Moths described in 1965
Moths of Asia